The Mittelberg is an 803.6 m high (above sea level) mountain located in the Thuringian Highland, Thuringia (Germany).

It is located close to the municipalities of Piesau and Lichte and the Leibis-Lichte Dam in the  Saalfeld-Rudolstadt district in the Thuringian Forest Nature Park.

The section of the Rennsteig walkway between Neuhaus am Rennweg, Ernstthal am Rennsteig, and Spechtsbrunn runs close to the mountain.

See also
 List of Mountains and Elevations of Thuringia
Mountains of Thuringia
Thuringian Forest
Lichte